The Good Fairy may refer to:

 The Good Fairy (play), a 1930 play by Ferenc Molnár
 The Good Fairy (1935 film), a 1935 film written by Preston Sturges based on a play by Ferenc Molnár
 The Good Fairy (1951 film), a 1951 film directed by Keisuke Kinoshita based on a novel by Kunio Kishida

See also
 Fairy godmother
 Good witch